Styloniscus is a genus of woodlice in the family Styloniscidae. It contains the following species :

Styloniscus araucanicus (Verhoeff, 1939)
Styloniscus australiensis Vandel, 1973
Styloniscus australis (Dollfus, 1890)
Styloniscus austroafricanus (Barnard, 1932)
Styloniscus capensis (Barnard, 1932)
Styloniscus cestus (Barnard, 1932)
Styloniscus commensalis (Chilton, 1910)
Styloniscus georgensis (Barnard, 1932)
Styloniscus hirsutus Green, 1971
Styloniscus horae (Barnard, 1932)
Styloniscus hottentoti (Barnard, 1932)
Styloniscus iheringi (Verhoeff, 1951)
Styloniscus insulanus Ferrara & Taiti, 1983
Styloniscus japonicus Nunomura, 2000
Styloniscus jeanneli (Paulian de Felice, 1940)
Styloniscus katakurai Nunomura, 2007
Styloniscus kermadecensis (Chilton, 1911)
Styloniscus longistylis Dana, 1853
Styloniscus maculosus Green, 1961
Styloniscus magellanicus Dana, 1853
Styloniscus mauritiensis (Barnard, 1936)
Styloniscus manuvaka Taiti & Wynne, 2015
Styloniscus monocellatus (Dollfus, 1890)
Styloniscus moruliceps (Barnard, 1932)
Styloniscus murrayi Dollfus, 1890
Styloniscus natalensis (Barnard, 1932)
Styloniscus nordenskjoeldi (Verhoeff, 1939)
Styloniscus otakensis (Chilton, 1901)
Styloniscus pallidus (Verhoeff, 1939)
Styloniscus phormianus (Chilton, 1901)
Styloniscus planus Green, 1971
Styloniscus riversdalei (Barnard, 1932)
Styloniscus romanorum Vandel, 1973
Styloniscus schwabei (Verhoeff, 1939)
Styloniscus simplex Vandel, 1981
Styloniscus simrothi (Verhoeff, 1939)
Styloniscus spinosus (Patience, 1907)
Styloniscus squarrosus Green, 1961
Styloniscus swellendami (Barnard, 1932)
Styloniscus sylvestris Green, 1971
Styloniscus tabulae (Barnard, 1932)
Styloniscus thomsoni (Chilton, 1885)
Styloniscus ventosus (Barnard, 1932)
Styloniscus verrucosus (Budde-Lund, 1906)

References

External links

Woodlice
Taxonomy articles created by Polbot